William E. Haskell was an American organ-builder and inventor born on November 29, 1865 in Chicago, Illinois. His father, Charles S. Haskell, was also an organ-builder employed by the Roosevelt organ company, located in Philadelphia. At the age of 18, Haskell began working with his father, and around 1901, he established the William E. Haskell Co. of Philadelphia, Pennsylvania. This organ-building firm was later acquired by Estey Organ Co., and Haskell became superintendent of the Estey pipe organ division, which was located in Vermont. He died there on May 13, 1927.

His most famous invention is an organ pipe manufacturing technique known as "Haskelling", where a thinner pipe is placed inside a thicker pipe to create a pipe with a deeper pitch than a normal pipe of the same length. It is used in spaces where it is too small for a full-length pipe to be feasible. It was invented for the Estey organ company, which manufactured many pipe organs, despite its focus on reed organs. He also invented several reedless orchestral imitation stops, such as the clarinet, oboe, and saxophone, whose advantage lay in the fact that they would stay in tune with the other flue stops. This was especially useful for instruments in more remote areas, where a tuner would not be as accessible.

Patents
Patent #641,509; 16 Jan. 1900; toilet flush valve
Patent #734,261; 21 Jul. 1903; organ
Patent #734,262; 21 Jul. 1903; organ
Patent #760,114; 17 May 1904; pneumatic valve
Patent #760,115; 17 May 1904; pneumatic coupler
Patent #795,608; 25 Jul. 1905; pneumatic
Patent #871,272; 19 Nov. 1907; pipe
Patent #923,263; 1 Jun. 1909; pneumatic
Patent #965,897; 2 Aug. 1910; pipe
Patent #967,911; 23 Aug. 1910; pipe
Patent #971,502; 27 Sep. 1910; pipe
Patent #1,078,851; 18 Nov. 1913; coupler
Patent #1,078,852; 18 Nov. 1913; coupler
Patent #1,173,507; 29 Feb. 1916; harp stop
Patent #1,230,895; 26 Jun. 1917; selector for player mechanism
Patent #1,236,430; 14 Aug. 1917; music player roll
Patent #1,250,165; 18 Dec. 1917; roll player registration
Patent #1,281,564; 15 Oct. 1918; swell regulation device
Patent #1,297,687; 18 Mar. 1919; pneumatic switch
Patent #1,304,971; 27 May 1919; player action control
Patent #1,323,530; 2 Dec. 1919; organ
Patent #1,327,996; 13 Jan. 1920; labial tuba mirabilis
Patent #1,477,485; 11 Dec. 1923; bottling machine
Patent #1,659,914; 21 Feb. 1928; stop action
Patent #1,636,996; 26 Jul. 1927; bottle cap

References

1865 births
1927 deaths
20th-century American inventors
20th-century American businesspeople
People from Philadelphia
People from Chicago
People from Vermont